In Russian, Masha is a diminutive of Maria. It has been used as a nickname or as a pet name for women named Maria or Marie. An alternative spelling in the Latin alphabet is "Macha". In Serbo-Croatian and Slovene, "Maša" is a diminutive of "Marija" but can be a given name in its own right. 

The Jewish name Masha is of Biblical extraction. Tradition has it that the first Masha was named after a departed male named Moshe (Moses).

Other diminutives of Maria 
There are a large number of diminutives (nicknames) in Russian for Maria beside Masha:
 Marusya
 Manya
 Manyunya
 Manyasha
 Mashunya
 Mashuta
 Mashenka
 Mar'ya
 Mashulya
 Mashka

Notable people 
 Masha Bruskina (1924–1941), Soviet partisan of the Minsk Resistance
 Masha Dashkina Maddux, Ukrainian dancer
 Masha Gessen (born 1967), Russian and American journalist and author
 Maria Kolenkina, Russian socialist revolutionary of the late 19th century
 Masha and Dasha Krivoshlyapova (1950–2003), Russian conjoined twins
 Masha Lubelsky (born 1936), Israeli politician
 Masha Ma, Chinese fashion designer
 Masha Rasputina (born 1964), Russian pop singer
 Masha (singer) or Masha Shirin (born 1990 or 1991), Latvian-born American pop singer
 Marie Yovanovitch (born 1958), American diplomat who served as ambassador to Kyrgyzstan, Armenia and Ukraine
 Maria "Masha Scream" Arkhipova (born 1983), lead singer of the Russian folk metal band Arkona
 Maria Viktorovna (born 1986), Russian-American YouTuber and ASMR performer
 Maria Vladimirovna "Masha" Alyokhina (born 1988), Russian political activist and musician.

Fictional characters 
 Masha, heroine of the Russian TV series Masha and the Bear 
 Masha, heroine of Pushkin's novel The Captain's Daughter
 Masha, one of the title characters in The Three Sisters (play) by Anton Chekhov
 Masha, Ilya's and Polina's daughter in The Seagull, another Chekhov play
 Masha, in the Tokyo Mew Mew manga series
 Masha Rostova, Elizabeth Keen's birth name in the TV series The Blacklist
 Masha, part of Elizabeth's entourage in the film Young Frankenstein
 Masha, obsessed fan in The King of Comedy (1983) played by Sandra Bernhard
 Marya "Masha" Morevna, main character in Deathless, a retelling of Russian folklore
 Maria "Masha", title character in Hayden Kopser's novella Masha (2021)
 Masha Dmitrichenko, in the miniseries Nine Perfect Strangers, based on the novel of the same name

References 

Russian feminine given names
Hypocorisms